Jesper Langberg (20 October 1940 – 29 June 2019) was a Danish film actor. He appeared in more than 50 films.

Biography
He was born in Frederiksberg, Denmark. He was the son of actor Sigurd Langberg and younger brother of actor Ebbe Langberg. He received the Bodil Award three times: in 1968 as Best Actor for his role in Sådan er de alle, in 1994 as Best Supporting Actor for Det forsømte forår and in 2014 for the Honorary Career Award.

Selected filmography
 It's Nifty in the Navy (1965)
 The Girl and the Millionaire (1965)
 Neighbours (1966)
 Me and My Kid Brother (1967)
 Mig og min lillebror og storsmuglerne (1968)
 Me and My Kid Brother and Doggie (1969)
 Amour (1970)
 Oh, to Be on the Bandwagon! (1972)
 Olsen-banden Junior (2001)

References

External links

1940 births
2019 deaths
Danish male film actors
Best Actor Bodil Award winners
People from Frederiksberg
Bodil Honorary Award recipients